Cave Hill Cemetery is a  Victorian era National Cemetery and arboretum located at Louisville, Kentucky. Its main entrance is on Baxter Avenue and there is a secondary one on Grinstead Drive. It is the largest cemetery by area and number of burials in Louisville.

Cave Hill was listed on the National Register of Historic Places in 1979. Cave Hill National Cemetery, containing military graves, is also on the National Register, added in 1998.

History 

Cave Hill was chartered in 1848 on what was William Johnston's Cave Hill Farm, then a rural property some distance east of Louisville.  Johnston, who died in 1798, had built the first brick house in Louisville on the grounds circa 1788. City officials had purchased part of the land in the 1830s in anticipation of building a railroad through it, and a workhouse was built there. The railroad was built elsewhere, and the land was leased to local farmers.

In 1846, Mayor Frederick A. Kaye began investigating the possibility of developing a rural or garden-style cemetery on the grounds, a popular concept at the time.  Hartford, Connecticut civil engineer Edmund Francis Lee was hired, who planned a cemetery with winding paths, graves across the tops of hills, and lakes and ponds in the valleys. The Cave Hill Cemetery Co. was chartered in February 1848, and the cemetery was dedicated on July 25, 1848. Reverend Doctor Edward Porter Humphrey delivered the dedicatory address and elaborated on the idea of the garden cemetery, noting, among other things, that ". . .Reason and taste suggest that [this cemetery] should be decorated appropriately by the beautiful productions of our great Creator. . ."

Before the era of large municipal parks, it was common for cities to promote a garden cemetery as a green oasis and recreation destination, and Louisville was no exception. This largely ended with the opening of nearby Cherokee Park in 1892.
After administrators sold several acres of land for the burial of Union soldiers during the Civil War, local Confederate supporters purchased nearby land as well. Several deceased patients from the Brown General Hospital and other nearby army medical facilities were interred in Cave Hill Cemetery.

Johnston's farmhouse (in what is now sections 33 and 34) was converted to the city's pesthouse, and was demolished in 1872. Also in 1872, Beechhurst Sanitarium was built near the pesthouse and the modern Grinstead entrance. Beechurst was torn down in 1936.

The entrance lodge and main gates were designed by Louisville architect William H. Reddin in 1880 in the style of Italian Renaissance Revival.

In the 1980s, razor wire was added to the brick walls surrounding Cave Hill to keep out after-hours visitors.

The first scenic overlook for the cemetery, Twin Lakes Scenic Overlook, opened on August 20, 2008.

Buildings and grounds 

The signature Baxter Avenue entrance, called the Broadway Entrance by the cemetery, was completed in 1892. The Corinthian-style building includes a  bell in its clock tower. The tower, once the tallest structure for miles, was frequently hit by lightning and last renovated in 2001. The Grinstead Drive entrance was built in 1913.

The third public entrance on the residential street of Dearing Court was closed as of 2007. Another public entrance, also no longer in use, was built off Payne Street in 1910, closest to the military sections. There are several service entrances around the perimeter. Other buildings include the stone office building near the lake, and the Rustic Shelter House built in 1892 at a cost of $565.

The cemetery contains monuments and graves of three Union generals.  The 32nd Indiana Monument, also known as the "August Bloedner Monument", is separately on the National Register.

The middle fork of Beargrass Creek runs through Cave Hill, and a source stream flowing into the creek roughly divides the cemetery in new (eastern) and old (western) sections. That stream flows from a spring near the cave that gave the property its name. There are also five man-made lakes.

The cemetery currently features more than 500 species of trees and shrubs, including some two dozen current state champion trees, including both native species such as pignut hickory (Carya glabra) and exotics such as Caucasian wingnut (Pterocarya fraxinifolia).  It is well known as an arboretum.

Interments 

There were about 120,000 people interred by 2002, with space remaining for 22,000 more graves. Notable among those interred in the cemetery is American Revolutionary War military war officer and founder of Louisville George Rogers Clark (1752–1818).

More than 200 Confederate soldiers are buried in Section "O" of the cemetery, with 30–40 buried in a row near the National Cemetery. The original wooden markers in Section "O" were replaced with stone markers in 1880–1881. A number of markers are marked as unknown. Included in the Section "O" burials is a Confederate Brigadier General, Alpheus Baker. There are two other Confederate generals buried in other locations in the cemetery. In the addition to Section "O" (lot 267½) are a number of residents of the Kentucky Confederate Home, who died around the start of the 20th century. The confederate flag flies over the area.

Within another U.S. Soldiers plot in Section E is one British war grave, of a soldier of the Machine Gun Corps, a member of the British Military Mission to the United States, who died in 1918.

Portrait painter and cousin of Mark Twain, Mary Ann Xantippe "Tip" Saunders, was interred at Cave Hill Cemetery in 1922. Patty Hill and Mildred J. Hill (sisters), composers of the Happy Birthday song, are interred here. Muhammad Ali, boxing champion born in Louisville, was interred on June 10, 2016. Also interred are the founder of Kentucky Fried Chicken, Colonel Harland Sanders; and Mia Zapata, lead singer of punk band The Gits. Paul Hornung, Heisman trophy winner and Green Bay Packer, was interred in 2020.

Gallery

Documents

See also 
 Eastern Cemetery (Louisville)
 History of Louisville, Kentucky
 List of attractions and events in the Louisville metropolitan area
 List of botanical gardens and arboretums in the United States
 List of mayors of Louisville, Kentucky
 Louisville, Kentucky, in the American Civil War
 National Register of Historic Places listings in The Highlands, Louisville, Kentucky

References

Further reading
 Thomas, Samuel W., Cave Hill Cemetery: A Pictorial Guide and Its History, Cave Hill Cemetery Company, Louisville, Kentucky 1985

External links 

 Cemetery website
 Map of the Cemetery
 Photos of selected graves with GPS coordinates
 Confederate Burials
 Confederate Burials in the Cave Hill National Cemetery
 
 
 

Arboreta in Kentucky
Botanical gardens in Kentucky
Cemeteries established in the 1840s
Cemeteries on the National Register of Historic Places in Kentucky
Louisville, Kentucky, in the American Civil War
National Register of Historic Places in Louisville, Kentucky
Tourist attractions in Louisville, Kentucky
Protected areas of Jefferson County, Kentucky
1848 establishments in Kentucky
Rural cemeteries
United States national cemeteries
Victorian architecture in Kentucky